This article contains information about the literary events and publications of 1969.

Events
February 8 – After 147 years, the last issue of The Saturday Evening Post in its original form appears in the United States.
March 23 – German-born writer Assia Wevill, a mistress of the English poet Ted Hughes and ex-wife of the Canadian poet David Wevill, gasses herself and their daughter at her London home.
April 22 – The first Booker-McConnell Prize for fiction is awarded to P. H. Newby for Something to Answer For.
August – "Penelope Ashe", purported author of a bestselling novel, Naked Came the Stranger, is revealed as a group of Newsday journalists.
unknown date – The Times Literary Supplement begins using the abbreviation "TLS" on its title page.

New books

Fiction
Eva Alexanderson – Kontradans (Counter-dance)
 Eric Ambler – The Intercom Conspiracy
Jorge Amado – Tenda dos Milagres (Tent of Miracles)
Kingsley Amis – The Green Man
William H. Armstrong – Sounder
Penelope Ashe – Naked Came the Stranger
Margaret Atwood – The Edible Woman
René Barjavel – Les Chemins de Katmandou
Ray Bradbury – I Sing the Body Electric
Melvyn Bragg – The Hired Man
 Christianna Brand – Court of Foxes 
William S. Burroughs – The Last Words of Dutch Schultz
Victor Canning – Queen's Pawn
Louis-Ferdinand Céline – Rigadoon
Agatha Christie – Hallowe'en Party
Michael Crichton – The Andromeda Strain
John Cheever – Bullet Park
A. J. Cronin – A Pocketful of Rye
Henry de Montherlant – Les Garçons (The Boys)
L. Sprague de Camp – The Golden Wind
Marion Eames – Y Stafell Ddirgel (The Secret Room)
John Fowles – The French Lieutenant's Woman
George MacDonald Fraser – Flashman
Sarah Gainham – A Place in the Country
Paul Gallico – The Poseidon Adventure
Graham Greene – Travels with My Aunt
Sam Greenlee – The Spook Who Sat by the Door
Günter Grass – Local Anaesthetic (Örtlich betäubt)
Frank Herbert – Dune Messiah
Raymond Hitchcock – Percy
Robert E. Howard, L. Sprague de Camp and Lin Carter – Conan of Cimmeria
B. S. Johnson – The Unfortunates
David H. Keller – The Folsom Flint and Other Curious Tales
Derek Lambert 
 Angels in the Snow
 The Kites of War
Ursula Le Guin – The Left Hand of Darkness
Elmore Leonard – The Big Bounce
Doris Lessing – The Four-Gated City
H. P. Lovecraft and Others – Tales of the Cthulhu Mythos
John D. MacDonald – Dress Her in Indigo
Félicien Marceau – Creezy
Yukio Mishima (三島 由紀夫) – Runaway Horses
Michael Moorcock – Behold the Man
C. L. Moore – Jirel of Joiry
Vladimir Nabokov – Ada or Ardor: A Family Chronicle
V. S. Naipaul – A House for Mr Biswas
M. T. Vasudevan Nair – Kaalam ("Time")
Patrick O'Brian – Master and Commander
Don Pendleton – War Against The Mafia
Chaim Potok – The Promise
Manuel Puig – Little Painted Mouths
Mario Puzo – The Godfather
Ellery Queen – The Campus Murders
Pauline Réage – Retour à Roissy
Mordecai Richler – The Street
Harold Robbins – The Inheritors
Philip Roth – Portnoy's Complaint
Gabriel Ruhumbika – Village in Uhuru
Giorgio Scerbanenco
I milanesi ammazzano al sabato
Milano calibro 9
Irwin Shaw – Rich Man, Poor Man
Dag Solstad – Irr! Grønt!
Rex Stout – Death of a Dude
Jacqueline Susann – The Love Machine
Theodore Taylor – The Cay
Colin Thiele – Blue Fin
Jack Vance
The Dirdir
Emphyrio
Servants of the Wankh
Mario Vargas Llosa – Conversation in the Cathedral
Kurt Vonnegut – Slaughterhouse-Five
Charity Waciuma – Daughter of Mumbi
Irving Wallace – The Seven Minutes
Keith Waterhouse – Everything Must Go
Colin Wilson – The Philosopher's Stone
Roger Zelazny
Creatures of Light and Darkness
Damnation Alley
Isle of the Dead

Children and young people
Rev. W. Awdry – Oliver the Western Engine (twenty-fourth in The Railway Series of 42 books by him and his son Christopher Awdry)
Eric Carle – The Very Hungry Caterpillar
Frances Carpenter – South American Wonder Tales
Penelope Farmer – Charlotte Sometimes
Rumer Godden – Operation Sippacik
Ruth Park – The Muddle-Headed Wombat on a Rainy Day
Gary Paulsen – Mr. Tucket (first in Mr. Tucket series)
Bill Peet – Fly Homer Fly
Barbara Sleigh – The Snowball
William Steig – Sylvester and the Magic Pebble
John Rowe Townsend – The Intruder
Elfrida Vipont with Raymond Briggs – The Elephant and the Bad Baby
Anne de Vries – Into the Darkness (first in the Reis door de nacht series of five books)

Drama
Leilah Assunção – Fala Baixo Senão Eu Grito (Speak Quietly or I’ll Scream)
Aimé Césaire – Une Tempête
Dario Fo – Mistero Buffo
Athol Fugard – Boesman and Lena
Joe Orton – What the Butler Saw (posthumously premiered and published)
Dennis Potter – Son of Man (television)
Dalmiro Sáenz – Quién yo? (Who me?)
David Storey – In Celebration
Paul Zindel – Let Me Hear You Whisper

Poetry

James Schuyler – Freely Espousing

Non-fiction
Dean Acheson – Present at the Creation: My Years in the State Department
Maya Angelou – I Know Why the Caged Bird Sings
Fernand Braudel – Ecrits sur l'Histoire (translated as On History, 1980)
H. Rap Brown – Die Nigger Die!
Henri Charrière – Papillon
L. Sprague de Camp and George H. Scithers (editors) – The Conan Swordbook
Antonia Fraser – Mary Queen of Scots
Peter Geach – God and the Soul
Søren Hansen and Jesper Jensen – The Little Red Schoolbook (Den Lille Røde Bog For Skoleelever)
Anton LaVey – The Satanic Bible
Laurie Lee – As I Walked Out One Midsummer Morning
Kate Millett – Sexual Politics
Desmond Morris – The Human Zoo
Harold Perkin – The Origins of Modern English Society 1780–1880
Laurence J. Peter and Raymond Hull – The Peter Principle: Why Things Always Go Wrong
David Reuben – Everything You Always Wanted to Know About Sex* (*But Were Afraid to Ask)

Births
January 12 – David Mitchell, English novelist
January 17 – Michael Moynihan, American journalist and publisher
January 21 – M. K. Hobson, American speculative fiction author
March – Jez Butterworth, English dramatist and screenwriter
May 6 – Emmanuel Larcenet, French comics author
May 6 – John Scalzi, American science-fiction author
May 28 – Muriel Barbery, French novelist
May 29 – Qiu Miaojin (邱妙津), Korean-born novelist (suicide 1995)
June 13 – Virginie Despentes, French writer
July 5 – Armin Kõomägi, Estonian author and screenwriter
August 4 – Jojo Moyes, English journalist and romantic novelist
September 12 - James Frey, American writer
September 30 - Julianna Baggott, American novelist, essayist, and poet
October 24 – Emma Donoghue, Irish-born Canadian novelist, dramatist, and academic
November 13 – John Belluso, American dramatist (died 2006)
November 28 – Hanne Ørstavik, Norwegian novelist
November 30 – David Auburn, American dramatist
unknown dates
Adrian Goldsworthy, Welsh military historian and novelist
John Harris, English writer, journalist and critic
Tom McCarthy, English novelist

Deaths
January 11 – Richmal Crompton, English children's writer (born 1890)
January 21 – Giovanni Comisso, Italian writer (born 1895)
March 9 – Charles Brackett, American novelist and screenwriter (born 1892)
March 11 – John Wyndham, English science fiction novelist (born 1903)
March 24 – Margery Fish, English gardening writer (born 1892)
March 25 – Max Eastman, American writer (born 1883)
March 26 – John Kennedy Toole, American novelist (suicide, born 1937)
March 27 – B. Traven, presumed German-born novelist (unknown year of birth)
April 6 – Gabriel Chevallier, French writer (born 1895)
April 7 – Rómulo Gallegos, Venezuelan novelist and politician, 48th President of Venezuela (born 1884)
May 4 – Osbert Sitwell, English novelist and poet (born 1892)
July 24 – Witold Gombrowicz, Polish playwright and novelist (born 1904)
July 27 – Vivian de Sola Pinto, English poet and memoirist (born 1895)
August 10 – Maurine Dallas Watkins, American journalist/play and screenwriter (born 1896)
August 14 – Leonard Woolf, English political theorist (born 1880)
August 27 – Ivy Compton-Burnett, English novelist (born 1884)
September 6 – Gavin Maxwell, Scottish naturalist and author (cancer, born 1914)
September 17 – Greye La Spina, American dramatist and short story writer (born 1880)
September 20 – Elinor Brent-Dyer, English children's writer (born 1894)
September 22 – Rachel Davis Harris, African American librarian (born 1869)
October 14 – August Sang, Estonian poet and literary translator (born 1914)
October 21 – Jack Kerouac, American novelist and poet (internal hemorrhage, born 1922)
November 6 – Susan Taubes, Hungarian American writer and Jewish intellectual (suicide, born 1928)
November 15 – Ignacio Aldecoa, Spanish writer (born 1925)

Awards
Nobel Prize for Literature: Samuel Beckett

Canada
See 1969 Governor General's Awards for a complete list of winners and finalists for those awards.

France
Prix Goncourt: Félicien Marceau, Creezy
Prix Médicis: Hélène Cixous, Dedans

United Kingdom
Booker Prize: P. H. Newby, Something to Answer For
Carnegie Medal for children's literature: K. M. Peyton, The Edge of the Cloud
Cholmondeley Award: Derek Walcott, Tony Harrison
Eric Gregory Award: Gavin Bantock, Jeremy Hooker, Jenny King, Neil Powell, Landeg E. White
James Tait Black Memorial Prize for fiction: Elizabeth Bowen, Eva Trout
James Tait Black Memorial Prize for biography: Antonia Fraser, Mary Queen of Scots
Queen's Gold Medal for Poetry: Stevie Smith

United States
American Academy of Arts and Letters Gold Medal for Drama: Tennessee Williams
Hugo Award: John Brunner, Stand on Zanzibar
Nebula Award: Ursula K. Le Guin, The Left Hand of Darkness
Newbery Medal for children's literature: Lloyd Alexander, The High King
Pulitzer Prize for Drama: Howard Sackler, The Great White Hope
Pulitzer Prize for Fiction: N. Scott Momaday – House Made of Dawn
Pulitzer Prize for Poetry: George Oppen: Of Being Numerous

Elsewhere
Miles Franklin Award: George Johnston, Clean Straw for Nothing
Premio Nadal: Francisco García Pavón Las hermanas coloradas
Viareggio Prize: Fulvio Tomizza, L'albero dei sogni

References

 
Years of the 20th century in literature